Aleksandr Fyodorovich Makhovikov (born 12 April 1951) is a former Soviet football player.

Honours
 Soviet Top League winner: 1976 (spring).
 Soviet Cup winner: 1977, 1984.

International career
Makhovikov made his debut for USSR on 30 April 1972, in the UEFA Euro 1972 quarterfinal against Yugoslavia. He did not play again for the national team until 1976. He played in the qualifiers for UEFA Euro 1980 (USSR did not qualify for the final tournament) and scored his only national team goal in his last USSR game, a friendly against West Germany.

External links
  Profile

1951 births
Footballers from Moscow
Living people
Soviet footballers
Association football defenders
Soviet Union international footballers
Soviet Top League players
FC Dynamo Moscow players
FC Kuban Krasnodar players